Psilogramma increta, the plain grey hawkmoth, is a moth of the family Sphingidae.

Distribution 
It is found from north-eastern China, Japan and Korea, south and east through China, Taiwan, Vietnam, Thailand, the Philippines and Peninsular Malaysia, to the Greater Sunda Islands, west through Myanmar, Nepal, Sri Lanka and India to Kashmir. It is an introduced species in Hawaii.

Description 
The wingspan is 90–122 mm.

Biology 
The larvae mostly feed on Oleaceae, Scrophulariaceae and Verbenaceae species, although there are records from other families. Recorded food plants include Campsis, Catalpa, Clerodendrum (including Clerodendrum tricotonum), Dimocarpus, Firmiana, Fraxinus, Ligustrum (including Ligustrum lucidum, Ligustrum obtusifolium and Ligustrum japonicum), Melia, Meliosma, Olea, Osmanthus (including Osmanthus fragrans), Paulownia (including Paulownia tomentosa and Paulownia coreana), Syringa (including Syringa reticulata and Syringa dilatata), Vitex (including Vitex negundo), Quercus aliena, Callicarpa dichotoma, Sesamum indicum, Perilla frutescens and Viburnum dilatatum.

Gallery

References

External links

Psilogramma
Moths described in 1865
Moths of Japan